Narges Koti or Narges Kati may refer to:
 Narges Koti, Babol, a village in Sajjadrud Rural District, Iran
 Narges Kati, Nur, a village in Mianrud Rural District, Iran